Manowar is an American heavy metal band from Auburn, New York. Formed in 1980, the group is known for lyrics based on fantasy (particularly sword and sorcery) and mythology (particularly Norse mythology and Greco-Roman mythology), as well as numerous songs celebrating the genre and its core audience. The band is also known for a loud and emphatic sound. In an interview for MTV in February 2007, bassist Joey DeMaio lamented that "these days, there's a real lack of big, epic metal that is drenched with crushing guitars and choirs and orchestras... so it's nice to be one of the few bands that's actually doing that". In 1984, the band was included in the Guinness Book of World Records for delivering the loudest performance, a record which they have since broken on two occasions. They also hold the world record for the longest heavy metal concert after playing for five hours and 1 minute in Bulgaria (at Kavarna Rock Fest) in 2008. They also have been known for their slogan "Death to false metal". The band maintains a strong cult following and has sold over 30 million copies of their recordings.

Biography

Origins (1980–1981)
Manowar's history began in 1980 when Joey DeMaio, the future bassist of the band, met guitarist Ross the Boss while working as a bass tech and fireworks manager for Black Sabbath on the Heaven & Hell Tour. Ross the Boss, a former member of the punk rock band the Dictators, was the guitar player in Black Sabbath's support band, Shakin' Street. The two bonded over their shared musical interests, became friends and decided to form a band with the suggestion and advice of Ronnie James Dio during the tour.
At the end of the tour with Black Sabbath, the duo got together to form Manowar. To complete the roster, they hired drummer Donnie Hamzik and singer Eric Adams, a former classmate and friend of DeMaio. The name Manowar was suggested to Joey DeMaio and Ross the Boss by their instrument designer, John "Dawk" Stillwell.

Battle Hymns (1981–1982)
On the strength of their debut demo, Manowar secured a recording contract with label Liberty Records in 1981. The label pressured the band to produce a good number of songs in a short time towards a debut album. The resultant album, Battle Hymns, was released the following year. The legendary actor and director Orson Welles served in the role of narrator on "Dark Avenger".

Soon after the album's release, Manowar engaged in their first tour. The band played support for hard rocker Ted Nugent, but their collaboration lasted only a few months. Manowar then decided to put together a short tour by themselves and all the arrangements were made in a few weeks by their manager. Despite these setbacks, the band gained domestic fame on this short tour and also began to get their first European fans, particularly in the United Kingdom and in Germany. Stressed from the strain of the continuing performances, Hamzik decided to leave the band at the end of this tour and was replaced with Scott Columbus.

Into Glory Ride and mainstream success (1983–1988)

By 1983, the band left Liberty Records and struck a deal with Megaforce Records in the US and Music for Nations in Europe—signing the contract in their own blood. The signing was a cover story in the 1983 July–August issue No. 47 of Kerrang!.

When Manowar returned home, they immediately went into a recording studio to produce what, in the intentions of the group, would have been a simple EP, but came out instead, due to the quantity and quality of the tracks made in that period, as the band's second album, Into Glory Ride. An EP was actually published in 1983 with the title Defender containing, as its main track, the eponymous song, which included more work by Orson Welles. The atmosphere of the album evoked classical heroic fantasy and mythology, and served as a predecessor to Viking metal. It contained several innovative features, both in style and sound, and led to a huge increase in the number of fans of the group, particularly in the United Kingdom, where the band planned a long tour that was ultimately canceled. The song "Defender" was later re-recorded and included in the Fighting the World album of 1987.

To apologize for the failure of their UK tour, Manowar decided to dedicate their next album to the United Kingdom. The album, Hail to England, was recorded and mixed in just six days and was released in early 1984.

Manowar soon returned to work in the recording studio. After leaving Music for Nations, the quartet released Sign of the Hammer ten months after their previous album.

Following further disagreements with their new label, the group changed record label to Atlantic Records in 1987. Via Atlantic, they released Fighting the World, which enjoyed more extensive distribution and increased the band's prominence in the international heavy metal scene. Album art was designed by Ken Kelly.

In 1988, Manowar released the album Kings of Metal, which is the band's best known work. Songs like "Heart of Steel", "Kings of Metal" and "Hail and Kill" are performed regularly in concerts. Kings of Metal is Manowar's highest-selling album worldwide.

Manowar embarked on a world tour, for a period of approximately three years, with stops in almost all European nations. During that tour, Joey DeMaio "fired" Ross the Boss. According to a 2008 interview with the guitarist, "Joey felt that Manowar would be better without me". He was replaced by David Shankle, who was chosen by members of the band after a search among about 150 candidates. Scott Columbus later also decided to leave the band during the Kings of Metal tour. Columbus himself picked his replacement Kenny Earl Edwards (soon nicknamed 'Rhino').

New albums, first video, and live publications (1992–2002)

A new musical unit after the recent changes, Manowar released The Triumph of Steel in 1992. It gained some success and was particularly famous for the presence of a suite lasting no less than 28 minutes entitled "Achilles, Agony and Ecstasy in Eight Parts", inspired by the events of the Iliad and the hero Achilles. After this release, the band went on a world tour for two years. After the expiration of their contract with Atlantic, the band signed with Geffen Records. In 1994, Shankle unexpectedly left the band to form his own group. He was replaced by Karl Logan, a musician met by DeMaio during a motor meeting. The same year saw the unexpected return of Scott Columbus, who replaced Edwards.

In 1996, they released Louder Than Hell, their first new studio album in four years. Despite good sales the album was criticized for its simple style.

Despite such criticisms, Manowar released a new collection, called Anthology, and their first live album, Hell on Wheels, released by BMG International in the guise of a double CD containing all the most popular songs of the group. Not having the time to record a new studio album because of the ongoing promotional tour, Manowar released a second live album, Hell on Stage.

Warriors of the World, Hell on Earth, and Magic Circle Music (2002–2005)

In 2002, six years after the last studio album, Manowar released the Warriors of the World album. Warriors of the World presented a sound somewhat renewed in style, but maintained the usual energy and power. The most famous tracks from the album became "Warriors of the World United", "House of Death" and "Call to Arms", in addition to Puccini's aria "Nessun Dorma", covered in honor of the Italian fans and sung live for the first time in a concert in Milan, Italy.

Manowar then began a long world tour, called "Warriors of the World United Tour" that kept them busy and away from a recording studio for a long time. To compensate for the lack of studio albums, the band released several DVDs: in 2002 the video Fire and Blood, in 2003 Hell on Earth Part III and in 2005 Hell on Earth Part IV. These (and all DVDs since the year 2000) were directed by Neil Johnson, and have all been certified Gold in Germany.

In 2003, DeMaio founded his own record label, Magic Circle Music, which became the official home of the band, having been created to fit the needs of Manowar, and other bands of similar genre. Under the label Magic Circle were also released the EP The Sons of Odin with footage taken during the Earthshaker Fest 2005.

Gods of War and Thunder in the Sky (2006–2009)

Manowar released Gods of War through Magic Circle Music in 2007. After playing numerous shows in Europe, including a concert that spanned the course of two nights, they worked on a new EP, entitled Thunder in the Sky, which was released in 2009. The EP consisted of two discs: the first playing the regular track list; the second playing the song "Father" in fifteen different languages.

Scott Columbus' death, Battle Hymns MMXI, and The Lord of Steel (2010–2013)
On June 1, 2010, Classic Rock magazine published an interview with drummer Scott Columbus who said that he had not worked with the band since April 2008 and had left the band. He also said that statements made in the past, regarding his break in 1990 and 2008 because of an illness and a personal tragedy, were largely untrue and were made without his agreement. On October 15, 2010, Joey DeMaio announced on Facebook that Hamzik was officially a member of Manowar again after a 26-year absence.

On April 4, 2011, Columbus died at the age of 54. On April 5, 2020, Columbus' daughter Teresa publicly announced that her father's cause of death was suicide, and urged for more awareness on mental illness and depression.

Manowar's subsequent release was a re-recording of their 1982 debut album Battle Hymns. This album was released on November 26, 2010, with the narration of Sir Christopher Lee and formally entitled Battle Hymns MMXI. On July 21, 2011, the band embarked on a UK tour for the first time in 16 years in November and performed the Battle Hymns album in its entirety.

Manowar's next studio album, The Lord of Steel, was released worldwide on June 16, 2012, exclusively on iTunes and on the band's own online store. The album sees a reversion from the symphonic elements present on the Gods of War album back to a more straightforward, heavy metal sound. The song "El Gringo" is featured in the soundtrack to the film of the same name.

After the Lord of Steel tour was over in 2013, Manowar released a live EP, titled The Lord of Steel Live, which included six live tracks recorded during the tour.

Kings of Metal MMXIV (2013–2014)
On July 28, 2013, Manowar announced that they would be re-recording their 1988 release Kings of Metal with an expected release date of late 2013. Brian Blessed recorded his narration for the track "The Warrior's Prayer" at Circle (Recording) Studios in Birmingham, England. Like the re-recording of Battle Hymns MMXI, this album allowed the band to use modern day technology.

Kings of Metal MMXIV was released through iTunes as a digital download on February 4, 2014. Hard copies of the album were released on February 28.

The embarked on a world tour in support of the album in 2014.

Upcoming twelfth studio album, Logan's arrest, and continued touring (2015–present)
On May 22, 2015, Manowar announced that they were currently working on a new studio album that was set to be released in early 2016. This album was not released, and instead they went to Europe in early 2016 for the "Gods and Kings World Tour 2016" which included their first concerts in Slovakia, Latvia and Belarus.

On May 25, 2016, the band announced that they would embark on their next world tour dubbed "The Final Battle". They would later recruit drummer Marcus Castellani from the tribute band Kings of Steel as their drummer for the tour.

On October 25, 2018, it was revealed that guitarist Karl Logan was arrested on August 9 in Charlotte, North Carolina, for allegedly possessing child pornography and was charged with six counts of third-degree exploitation of a minor. Manowar issued a statement shortly after saying that Logan would not perform with them. They then said that their upcoming album and tour would not be affected. Following Logan's arrest, former guitarist David Shankle expressed interest in rejoining the band.

On January 1, 2019, Manowar announced that guitarist E.V. Martel would join them on their tour. On March 22, 2019, the band announced that they would release a trilogy of EP's based upon The Final Battle World Tour. The first EP, The Final Battle I, was released on March 29 in an exclusive pre-sale at the merchandise booth in Frankfurt and also during the European shows. It was then released on iTunes worldwide that day. The EP was digitally and physically released on May 30. Former HammerFall and Yngwie Malmsteen drummer Anders Johansson was announced as the new live drummer shortly after and made his debut at the March 25 show in Brno. Despite the tour's name, bassist Joey DeMaio dismissed any claims of Manowar's retirement, mainly due to the fans' demands to have them continue to perform.

In June 2019, the band's appearance at Hellfest was cancelled for undisclosed reasons. Fans who were to attend the show expressed their disappointment towards their cancellation. Manowar stepped in and said that they did not cancel their performance, but that it was the festival's organizers who cancelled their appearance in an announcement that appeared on their website. Swedish band Sabaton replaced Manowar in the lineup. Joey DeMaio later said that the band filed a lawsuit against the Hellfest organizers.

In May 2020, Manowar announced that they would embark on a tour, beginning in April 2021 in Europe, to celebrate their 40th anniversary. However, the band did not tour in 2020 and 2021.

On June 4, 2022, the day of the first show of their 2022/23 tour, it was announced drummer Anders Johansson could not perform with the band on their upcoming "Crushing The Enemies of Metal Anniversary Tour '22/'23" due to family commitments, and was replaced by Dave Chedrick for the tour. On September 2, 2022, following the announcement by guitarist E.V. Martel that he would not be available for touring next year, the band announced Michael Angelo Batio as their touring guitarist for their upcoming 2023 “Crushing The Enemies Of Metal” Anniversary Tour.

Band members 

Current members
Joey DeMaio – bass, keyboards (1980–present), guitars (2018–present)
Eric Adams – vocals (1980–present)

Current live members
Dave Chedrick – drums (2022–present)
Michael Angelo Batio – guitars (2022–present)

Former members
Carl Canedy – drums (1980–1981)
Ross the Boss Friedman – guitars, keyboards (1980–1989)
Donnie Hamzik – drums (1981–1983, 2009–2017)
Scott Columbus – drums (1983–1991, 1994–2008; died 2011)
David Shankle – guitars (1989–1994)
Kenny Earl "Rhino" Edwards – drums (1991–1994, 2008–2009)
Karl Logan – guitars, keyboards (1994–2018)

Former live members
Marcus Castellani – drums (2017–2019)        
E.V.Martel – guitar    (2019–2022)                       
Anders Johansson – drums (2019–2022)

Timeline

The Faceless Warrior 
The Faceless Warrior, also known as the King of Metal, is the band's mascot. The character first appeared in 1988 on the cover of the album Kings Of Metal, and has since appeared in the cover artwork of almost every following Manowar album, as well as on merchandise and in almost every Manowar live show to follow.

In a May 2002 interview with Metal-Rules.com, vocalist Eric Adams was asked, "Who is that guy in your album cover? Do you have any name for him?". He replied, "No because he is you, he is her, he is this person he is that person and so on. He has no face and that was in [sic] purpose because everyone needs a heroes [sic] in their life and our music is all about heroes and you know being the leader not the follower. It's picture [sic] of hero and you being that hero is that what it is all about. So there is no real name for it. It's a fantasy world man. Put your face there are you are the hero!"

The Sign of the Hammer 
"The Sign of the Hammer" is a cultural gesture developed in the early years of the band, after the release of their fourth album of the same name, and serves as a signature of the band: It is formed by raising a right fist above the head, while using the left hand to grab the back of the right wrist. The sign is most likely to have been shaped from the vocalist Eric Adams.  The Media Company "Heilbronner Stimme" published an article describing the Sign of the Hammer as, "the striking greeting. A gesture that unites. A gesture that fits the pathos of the self-proclaimed Kings of Metal. A gesture that has become the trademark of the group founded in 1980".

The first official appearance of the gesture was on the front cover of the band's fifth album, Fighting the World, where vocalist Eric Adams is shown making the gesture in a drawing of the band members.  The gesture then appeared in the official music video for Blow Your Speakers, shown being made by the band members and crowd during a concert, as well as in the full cover art of the album The Triumph of Steel. Since then, the sign has been featured in almost every official music video of the band.

Awards
Metal Hammer Golden Gods Awards

|-
| 2012 || Joey DeMaio || The Golden God ||

Discography

Demo albums
Manowar (1981)

Studio albums
Battle Hymns (1982)
Into Glory Ride (1983)
Hail to England (1984)
Sign of the Hammer (1984)
Fighting the World (1987)
Kings of Metal (1988)
The Triumph of Steel (1992)
Louder Than Hell (1996)
Warriors of the World (2002)
Gods of War (2007)
Battle Hymns MMXI (2010)
The Lord of Steel (2012)
Kings of Metal MMXIV (2014)

Legacy and influence on other artists and the genre 
Manowar have a very important place in the history and evolution of heavy metal music and are a huge influence in the Heavy Metal genre especially on subgenres such as: Power Metal, Epic/ Symphonic/ Melodic Metal, Viking metal, War Metal, Pagan Metal, Folk Metal, Doom Metal, Gothic Metal and Death Metal and "on every power metal band to emerge in the past 25 years". "Manowar's influence in the Rock Music industry is undeniable, they have left their mark in the Heavy Metal genre thanks to a combination of unique craftsmanship and characteristic songwriting". Manowar has influenced a huge amount of Heavy Metal bands and artists around the world, such as: Sabaton, Burning Witches, Rhapsody of Fire, Brothers of Metal, Warkings Amon Amarth Battle Beast, Beast in Black, Death, Elvenking, Symphony X, Firewind, Abbath Battleroar, Exmortus, Hammer King, Jack Starr's Burning Starr, Battle Born, Rocka Rollas, Týr, Warrior Path, Wotan, Wizard, HammerFall, Van Canto, Ensiferum, Avatar, Trivium, Majesty, Angra, Eternal Champion, Evertale, Death Dealer, Burning Point, Crystal Viper, Scared Outcry, Imperial Age, Therion, Hercules, Lost Horizon, Visigoth, Atlantean Kodex, Vhäldemar, Grand Magus, HolyHell, Skelator, Doomsword, Ironsword, Metal Law, Orden Ogan Pegazus, Battlerage, Hellish War, Holy Martyr, Grey Wolf, Moonspell Cryonic Temple, Runelord, Iron Kobra, Trick or Treat Hürlement, Assedium, Wrathblade, Rosae Crucis, Validor, Stormburner, Hysterica, Stormwarrior, Skullview, Steelpreacher, Kramp, Mike Lepond's Silent Assassins, Axe Steeler, Paladine, Vanlade, Claymorean,Arch Enemy, Korpiklaani, Marius Danielsen, Seven Witches, Adramelch, Steel Attack, Stormwarrior, Aktarum, Atramentus, Derdian, Dread Sovereign, White Skull, Heathen Foray, High Reeper& Hippie Death Cult, Ironflame, Khemmis, Nocturnal, Seven Kingdom, Silver Bullet, Vanir, Veonity, Winter's Verge, Winterhymn, Wintersun, Falconer, Children of Bodom Destroy Destroy Destroy Holy Dragons Arryan Path, Guardians of Time, Sons of Apollo, Sound Storm, Sulphur Aeon, Unleash the Archers Wolfthooth, Crom, Coronatus Perpetual EtudeBrainstorm Untamed Land Feuerschwanz Immortal and many more.

See also
 Loudest band in the world
 Heavy metal music
 List of heavy metal bands
 Battle Hymns Tour

References

External links

1980 establishments in New York (state)
American power metal musical groups
Atco Records artists
Atlantic Records artists
Geffen Records artists
Heavy metal musical groups from New York (state)
 
Musical groups established in 1980
Musical groups from New York City
Musical quartets
Nuclear Blast artists